The 2023 Nigerian presidential election in Nasarawa State was held on 25 February 2023 as part of the nationwide 2023 Nigerian presidential election to elect the president and vice president of Nigeria. Other federal elections, including elections to the House of Representatives and the Senate, will also be held on the same date while state elections will be held two weeks afterward on 11 March.

Background
Nasarawa State is a large state in the North Central with vast natural areas and a improving health sector but facing underdeveloped agriculture and intense challenges in security as the nationwide kidnapping epidemic, inter-ethnic violence, and herder–farmer clashes have all heavily affected the state. Politically, the state's 2019 elections had a significant swing towards the state APC. In federal elections, Buhari won the state by just 1% while the APC swept all senate seats by gaining two PDP-held seats. Similarly, the APC gained one PDP-held House of Representatives seat, held the governorship, and kept the majority in the House of Assembly.

Polling

Projections

General election

Results

By senatorial district 
The results of the election by senatorial district.

By federal constituency
The results of the election by federal constituency.

By local government area 
The results of the election by local government area.

See also 
 2023 Nasarawa State elections
 2023 Nigerian presidential election

Notes

References 

Nasarawa State gubernatorial election
2023 Nasarawa State elections
Nasarawa